Ivan Ivanovitch Stankevich (11 April 1914, Moscow, Russian Empire — 28 November 1978, Moscow, USSR) was a Soviet football player. He played as defense for Moscow clubs Lokomotiv and Dynamo.

Early life
Ivan Stankevich was born on April 11, 1914 in Moscow as a son of Moscow State University professor Ivan Stankevitch. 

After graduating from the Moscow Institute of Transport Engineers, he taught theoretical mechanics in the Department of Theoretical Mechanics and Hydraulics at the Moscow Machine Tool Institute from 1953 to 1976. He was a candidate of technical sciences and also Deputy Dean of the evening faculty of the Institute.

Football 
As a  young man, he played for Moscow teams "Factory" named after F. E. Dzerzhinsky («Завод имени Ф. Э. Дзержинского») and "Sniper" («Снайпер»). From 1937 to 1939, he played for Lokomotiv. on August 11, he debuted in the USSR league in a match against Dynamo Leningrad, as a substitute for Ilya Gvozdkov. While playing in Lokomotiv, he trained at the Institute of railway engineers and received the specialty of track engineer.

In 1940, he transferred to Dynamo. With the White-Blues, he became a two-time national champion and a three-time silver medalist. He played in a USSR Cup Final, where his team lost against CDKA. In 1948, he was awarded the title of "Master of Sport." He retired from football due to multiple injuries.

In 1945 he was a member of the Dynamo tour in the UK.

From 1949 to 1951 he was an assistant coach at Dynamo.

References

External links
Ivan Stankevich

Soviet footballers
FC Lokomotiv Moscow players
FC Dynamo Moscow players
Soviet Top League players
Honoured Masters of Sport of the USSR
Footballers from Moscow
1914 births
1978 deaths
Association football defenders